Arild Øystein Mentzoni (born 20 September 1945) is a Norwegian meteorologist and weather presenter.

He was hired in the Norwegian Meteorological Institute, and became a prime time weather presenter for the Norwegian Broadcasting Corporation in 1977. He retired in 2010, but continued working part-time for the Meteorological Institute.

He resides in Lørenskog.

References

1945 births
Living people
Norwegian meteorologists
Weather presenters
NRK people
People from Lørenskog